Yu Seung-hun (born 9 October 1969) is a South Korean water polo player. He competed in the men's tournament at the 1988 Summer Olympics.

References

1969 births
Living people
South Korean male water polo players
Olympic water polo players of South Korea
Water polo players at the 1988 Summer Olympics
Place of birth missing (living people)
Asian Games medalists in water polo
Water polo players at the 1990 Asian Games
Medalists at the 1990 Asian Games
Asian Games bronze medalists for South Korea